Professor Jonathan Samuel Friedland  is a British physician and medical researcher who is Deputy Vice-Chancellor (Research and Enterprise) and Professor of Infectious Diseases at St George's, University of London.

Early life and education
Jonathan Friedland is the son of Albert and Rosalind Friedland. He was educated at St Paul's School, London before going on to study medicine at Corpus Christi College, University of Cambridge and King's College Hospital. His junior medical training posts were at The Royal Brompton Hospital, The Royal Postgraduate Medical School and The John Radcliffe Hospital in Oxford.  Friedland completed a Clinical Research Fellowship funded by the Medical Research Council at St George's, University of London.

Career
Friedland was appointed Senior Lecturer at The Royal Postgraduate Medical School and Honorary Consultant in Infectious Disease at the Hammersmith Hospital. In 2004, he became Professor of Infectious Diseases and Head of Infectious Diseases and Immunity at the Royal Postgraduate Medical School later Imperial College London, becoming Director (formerly Dean), Hammersmith campus, Imperial College London in 2010. Friedland had an active clinical practice as Honorary Consultant in Infectious Diseases and Medicine, Imperial College Healthcare (formerly Hammersmith Hospitals) NHS Trust (1994-2018). In 2018 Friedland was appointed Deputy Principal (Research and Enterprise) and Professor of Infectious Diseases at St George's, University of London.

He is a non-executive board member of the UK Health Security Agency (2022-). He was appointed Chair of the newly formed MHRA Expert Working Group on COVID-19 Therapeutics in 2020 He was Vice-Chair of the Commission on Human Medicines (commissioner 2014-2022). He was Chair of the MHRA, Expert Advisory Group on Infection, 2015-2022. He was also a member of the COVID-19 Vaccine Safety Surveillance Methodologies Expert Working Group. He served on the Joint Committee for Vaccination and Immunisation (2005–13), and the Chief Medical Officer's National Expert Panel on New and Emerging Infections (2007–12).

He was President of the British Infection Association, from 2007 to 2009. He has served on numerous charity grant giving bodies including as a Member of the Medical Research Council Clinical Training and Career Development Panel, 2009–13.

In 2020, Friedland was elected to the executive committee of the European Society of Clinical Microbiology and Infectious Diseases (ESCMID), taking up the role of Scientific Affairs Secretary. He has held various other roles within ESCMID including as a member of the programme committee of the European Congress of Clinical Microbiology and Infectious Diseases (ECCMID) which is the largest infection conference in the world.

Research
Friedland's research is focused on innate immune responses, and particularly the role of matrix metalloproteinases, in the immunopathology of tuberculosis and the development of host-directed therapy. He also has long-standing research interests in migrant health as well as in new TB diagnostics. Friedland has published over 240 peer reviewed papers, invited editorials and reviews as well as 3 books.

Awards
In 2005 his Research team won the Medical Futures Innovations Award for best overall innovation. In 2005, Friedland was awarded the Royal College of Physicians Weber-Parkes Prize Medal for research in tuberculosis. He was elected Fellow of the Academy of Medical Sciences in 2008 and a Fellow of the Royal College of Physicians of Ireland in 2010. In 2017, he was awarded an inaugural Fellowship of the European Society of Clinical Microbiology and Infectious Diseases.

Chess
Friedland lists chess as a pastime in an interview for The Lancet. Friedland was the Cambridge University Chess Champion, and represented Cambridge in the 97th-99th Varsity Chess Matches.  He was awarded 'Best Cambridge Game' for his match in the 98th. In 2004 Friedland achieved the title of Candidate Master (CM) and won the Chess Blitz Championship Gold Medal in the 2018 Mind Sports Olympiad

Personal life
Friedland lives in London with his wife and their 2 children.

References 

Living people
British immunologists
Fellows of the Academy of Medical Sciences (United Kingdom)
Alumni of Corpus Christi College, Cambridge
People educated at St Paul's School, London
Fellows of the Royal College of Physicians of Ireland
Year of birth missing (living people)